Colette Elloy (born 5 July 1931) is a French hurdler. She competed in the women's 80 metres hurdles at the 1952 Summer Olympics.

References

1931 births
Living people
Athletes (track and field) at the 1952 Summer Olympics
French female hurdlers
Olympic athletes of France
Place of birth missing (living people)